Scottish Radio Holdings (SRH) was a Scottish media company which owned 22 radio stations, and around 30 local newspapers in the United Kingdom and Ireland.

History

SRH had its origins in the 1970s when Glasgow was awarded the third licence for a commercial station in the UK. As a result, in 1973 Radio Clyde began broadcasting. Unlike the two existing commercial stations (both in London), Radio Clyde was an immediate success. This was helped in part by strong financial backers that included Sean Connery and Jackie Stewart.

In 1991 laws controlling the ownership of commercial stations were relaxed. Clyde merged with Radio Forth to form SRH and immediately floated on the London Stock Exchange.

In 1995 it acquired Morton Newspapers which owned around 20 newspapers in Northern Ireland. Since then SRH expanded operations by acquiring further publications in Scotland and Ireland.

SRH had a network of 22 stations when it was acquired by rival media group Emap on 21 June 2005. The newspaper titles published by SRH, collectively known as Score Press, was sold to Johnston Press for £155million. The group's newspaper interests were sold off as were the firm's radio operations in Ireland. SRH's UK radio operations were integrated into those of Emap with the two SRH-owned Vibe FM stations becoming Kiss 101 and Kiss 105-108. The group's FM stations in Scotland formed a local version of the Big City Network which Emap were already operating in England. Emap also took on SRH's AM stations in Scotland, Wave 105 on England's south coast, and two stations in Northern Ireland from SRH.

In December 2007, Emap announced that their consumer media interests including radio stations would be sold to Hamburg based Bauer Media Group.

References

Companies formerly listed on the London Stock Exchange
Defunct companies of Scotland